Rhodium(III) iodide is an inorganic compound with the formula RhI3. It is a black solid.

Preparation 
Rhodium(III) iodide can be synthesised by the reaction of aqueous potassium iodide with rhodium(III) bromide.

RhBr3 + 3KI → RhI3 + 3KBr

Structure 
RhI3 adopts same crystal structure motif as AlCl3 and YCl3. The structure consists of cubic close-packed iodide ions and rhodium ions filling a third of the octahedral interstices, forming a layers.

Reactivity 
Rhodium(III) iodide is only known in the anhydrous form. It does not form hydrates. The related anion [RhI6]3− was previously thought not to form but has since been prepared by diffusion of RhCl3·3H2O through a layer of hydroiodic acid into piperazine.

References

Rhodium(III) compounds
Iodides
Platinum group halides